Frantz Dorsainvil (born 2 July 1991) is a Haitian swimmer. He received a universality spot to compete in 50m freestyle at the 2015 Pan American Games in Toronto and finished 22nd with a time of 33.83 seconds. He competed in the men's 50 metre freestyle event at the 2016 Summer Olympics, where he ranked 83rd with a time of 30.86 seconds. He did not advance to the semifinals.

References

1991 births
Living people
Haitian male swimmers
Olympic swimmers of Haiti
Swimmers at the 2016 Summer Olympics
Place of birth missing (living people)
Pan American Games competitors for Haiti
Swimmers at the 2015 Pan American Games